Cedarcliff Gatehouse is a historic gatehouse located in Poughkeepsie, in Dutchess County, New York.  It is believed to have been designed by architect Andrew Jackson Downing and built about 1845.  It is a -story, cruciform plan brick cottage in the Gothic Revival style. It features deep eaves with extended rafters and bargeboards with scroll-sawn overlay.  The property includes a period cast iron gateway and fence.

It was added to the National Register of Historic Places in 1982.

References

Houses on the National Register of Historic Places in New York (state)
Gothic Revival architecture in New York (state)
Houses completed in 1845
Houses in Poughkeepsie, New York
National Register of Historic Places in Poughkeepsie, New York